Gorle is a comune (municipality) in the Province of Bergamo in the Italian region of Lombardy, located about  northeast of Milan and about  east of Bergamo.

Gorle borders the following municipalities: Bergamo, Pedrengo, Ranica, Scanzorosciate, Seriate, Torre Boldone.

Demographic evolution

References